Blackboard Wars is an American reality documentary television series on the Oprah Winfrey Network that premiered on February 16, 2013, at 9/8c.

Premise
The series encompasses John McDonogh High School, a school stricken with violence and failing academic performance, as they work to transform the school into the best it's been in years. Steve Barr and new principal Marvin Thompson have trained the new staff to maintain a standard for student behavior and daily attendance all the while providing a safe environment. Viewers also see challenges the staff face as their students struggle with a range of emotionally demanding obstacles which includes teenage pregnancy, gang violence, homelessness and drug abuse.

Cast
 Dr. Marvin Thompson - Principal
 Steve Barr - CEO of charter organization Future is Now Schools.
 Ms. Baye Cobb - Math Teacher
 Ms. Emily Wilcox - Math Teacher
 Ms. Irnessa Marie Campbell - Head of the Math Department
 Ms. Neisha Riley - Student Counselor

Episodes

Awards and nominations
 2013 CableFAX's Program & Top Ops Awards - Best Show or Series Documentary – Other – NOMINATION
 2013 CableFAX's Program & Top Ops Awards - Best Show or Series – Professions – WINNER
 Fall 2013 CINE Golden Eagle – Televised Reality Division – Verite/Lifestyle – WINNER
 2014 New York Festivals TV & Film Awards – BRONZE MEDAL WINNER

References

External links
 
 

2013 American television series debuts
2013 American television series endings
English-language television shows
Oprah Winfrey Network original programming